Lord Valentine's Castle is a novel by Robert Silverberg published in 1980.

Plot summary
Lord Valentine's Castle is a novel that details the saga of a hero who reestablishes a legitimate government and saves the planet Majipoor from tyranny.

Reception
Kirkus Reviews states "In terms of sf underpinnings, Majipoor is an inexcusably flimsy construct; and a large cast of promising characters is left rattling around the lengthy and plodding narrative in such a meagerly developed state as to resembled blighted peas in a pod. Disappointing."

Greg Costikyan reviewed Lord Valentine's Castle in Ares Magazine #4 and commented that "despite the detail, despite the novel's dreamy pace, Silverberg never loses his reader, is never boring. To the contrary, Lord Valentine's Castle is, in the demeaning argot of Madison Avenue, a page-turner."

Lord Valentine's Castle won the Locus Award for Best Fantasy Novel in 1981, and was a Hugo Award nominee in 1981.

Douglas Cohen for Tor.com said that "The story isn’t a puzzle, challenging readers to figure out whether this tale is science fiction or fantasy.  It is science fantasy.  It is a successful melding of both genres, as it  borrows, tweaks, merges, and in some cases entirely reinvents.  Books like Lord Valentine’s Castle seek to take the best of both genres and merge them into a seamless tale.  Containing scientific and fantastical elements is both acceptable and expected."

Reviews
Review by Algis Budrys (1980) in The Magazine of Fantasy & Science Fiction, May 1980 
Review by Melissa Mia Hall (1980) in Fantasy Newsletter, No. 25 June 1980 
Review by Baird Searles (1980) in Isaac Asimov's Science Fiction Magazine, July 1980 
Review by Tom Staicar (1980) in Amazing Stories, August 1980 
Review by Joseph Nicholas (1980) in Vector 99 
Review by Doug Fratz (1980) in Thrust, #15, Summer 1980

References

External links
 

1980 American novels
1980 science fiction novels
American science fiction novels
Novels by Robert Silverberg